Zurbrügg is a German surname originating in Switzerland. Notable people with the surname include:

Christina Zurbrügg (born 1961), Swiss singer
Chris Zurbrugg (born 1964), American football player
Lindsey Zurbrugg (born 1998), American wheelchair basketball player
Rolf Zurbrügg (born 1971), Swiss ski mountaineer

German-language surnames